Danièle Pistone (born 1 December 1946) is a French musicologist, emeritus professor at the University Paris Sorbonne 4.

Biography

Since 1971, she has been teaching at the University of Paris-Sorbonne where she was appointed professor of history of music in 1981.

She has been an adviser for artistic training and cultural projects to the Scientific and Technical Mission of the Ministry of Research and has represented Higher Education at the Interdepartmental Mission for the Development of Arts Education (1994–1998).

In 2004, she was elected a correspondent at the Académie des beaux-arts.

Publications

As author
1973: Le piano dans la littérature française des origines jusqu'en 1900, Lille, Atelier de reproduction des thèses, 1975 (diffusion Honoré Champion) . Thèse d'État under the direction of Jacques Chailley (Paris 4).
1979: La musique en France de la Révolution à 1900, Éditions Honoré Champion
1980: Wagner et Paris, RIMF, Slatkine-Champion
1984: Les musiciens français à Rome, RIMF, Slatkine-Champion
1986: L'opéra italien au XIXe siècle, de Rossini à Puccini, Honoré Champion, translated into English (Cambridge, Amadeus Press) and Portuguese (Lisboa, Caminho)
1986: Manifeste et musique en France, RIMF, Slatkine-Champion
1989: Musique en pensées, Honoré Champion
1994: Symbolisme et musique en France, RIMF, Slatkine-Champion
2004: La musique dans la société: deux siècles de recherches, L'Harmattan, 2004
2009: Les suppléments de 'Musica', 1902-1914, OMF Editions of the Observatoire musical français
2011: Périodiques français relatifs à la musique: répertoire alphabétique et chronologique indexé (1690–2011), OMF 
2013: Répertoire des thèses françaises relatives à la musique (1810–2011), Honoré Champion  
2013: Un demi-siècle d'œuvres pianistiques éditées en France (1830–1880), OMF 
2015: 25 ans de créations opératiques en France (1990–2015), OMF
2015: Notes sur la vie musicale des années 1990 d'après six magazines français indexés, OMF

As co-author
 Le commentaire musicologique du grégorien à 1700, Honoré Champion (1/1976, 3/1985) (with Serge Gut)
 Les partitions d'orchestre de Haydn à Stravinsky. Histoire, lecture, réduction, commentaire, Honoré Champion, 1/1977, 2/1982 (with S. Gut)
 La musique de chambre en France de 1870 à 1918, Honoré Champion (1/1978, 2/1986) (with S. Gut)
 Le chant grégorien. Historique et pratique, Honoré Champion (1/1981, 5/1993) (with A. Madrignac)
1982: Musique et musicologie dans les universités françaises, Honoré Champion (with M. Delahaye) 
2001: Johann Svendsen. Karneval in Paris, F. Noetzel (with H. Herrestahl) 
2003: Mémoires de Maîtrise des universités françaises, OMF, (with N. Cousin) 
2003: Berlioz, hier et aujourd’hui, L’Harmattan, (with C. Rudent)

As editor or co-editor
1976: Ravel au XXe siècle, CNRS
1983: L'éducation musicale en France, PUPS
1984: Sur les traces de Frédéric Chopin, Honoré Champion
1987: Le théâtre lyrique français contemporain, Honoré Champion
1990: L'interprétation de Chopin en France, Honoré Champion
1991: La musique à l'université. Bilans et perspectives, OMF
1994: Analyse musicale et perception, OMF (with J.-P. Mialaret) 
1996: Musique et style. Méthodes et concepts, OMF
1996: Grieg et Paris: romantisme, symbolisme et modernisme musical franco-norvégien, Presse de l'Université de Caen (with H. Herresthal)
1999: Musiques d’Orphée, PUF (with P. Brunel)
1999: Pianistes virtuoses à Paris autour de Frédéric Chopin, Warsow (with I. Poniatowska) 
2000: Musiques et musiciens à Paris dans les années trente, Honoré Champion 
2000: Musique et linguistique de spécialité, OMF
2001: Littérature et musique dans la France du XXe siècle, Presses Universitaires de Strasbourg (with J.-L. Backès et Cl. Coste) 
2002: La musique et l’imaginaire, OMF
2003: Les pratiques de concert, OMF (with J.-P. Mialaret)
2004: Analyse et contextualisation, OMF (with M. Battier)
2005: Polytonalité/Polymodalité, Histoire et actualité, OMF (with M. Fischer)
2006: L'universel et l'utopique. Hommage à François-Bernard Mâche, OMF
2006: Héros et héroïnes de l'opéra symboliste, OMF
2007: Opéra italien et dramaturgie, OMF (with A. Guarnieri) 
2007: Pianos et pianistes dans la France d’aujourd’hui, OMF
2007: Pianistes du XXe siècle : critique, pédagogie, interprétation, OMF
2008: Autour du clavecin moderne : hommage à Elisabeth Chojnacka, OMF
2008: Le commentaire auditif de spécialité, OMF
2008: Des Ballets russes aux Ballets suédois : quelques aspects de la vie musicale parisienne, 1909–1929, OMF
2009: Musicologies d’aujourd’hui , OMF
2009: Corpus et typologies, OMF, (with J. Pimentel)
2010: La musique au temps des arts, PUPS, (with G. Denizeau)
2011: Recherches sur la presse musicale française, OMF
2011: La voix parlée et chantée, 1890-1903: étude et indexation d’un périodique français, OMF
2012: Villa-Lobos, des sources de l’œuvre aux échos contemporains, Honoré Champion, (with L. F. de Alencastro, A. Fléchet and J. Pimentel)
2012: Paroles et musiques, L’Harmattan, (with C. Naugrette)
2013: Le piano dans la France du Second Empire, OMF
2013: Musique, analogie, symbole : l’exemple des musiques de l’eau, OMF
2014: Fascinantes étrangetés, La découverte de l’altérité musicale en Europe au XIXe siècle, L'Harmattan (with L. Charles-Dominique and Y. Defrance).
2014: Piano français des années 1870, OMF
2015: La musique à Paris en 1880, OMF
2015: Regards sur la presse musicale française, XIXe-XXIe s, OMF
2016: Le wagnérisme dans tous ses états, 1913-2013, Presses Sorbonne Nouvelle, (with C. Leblanc)

External links
 Danièle Pistone on IREMUS
 Danièle Pistone on Thèses
 OPÉRA ET SOCIÉTÉ: BILANS ET PERSPECTIVES by Danièle Pistone
 Université de Paris-Sorbonne CV des enseignants 
 Académie des beaux-arts 
 Danièle Pistone on Canal Académie
 Danièle Pistone (Paris-Sorbonne/OMF) - Introduction on YouTube 

1946 births
20th-century French musicologists
21st-century French musicologists
French radio producers
Living people
Academic staff of Paris-Sorbonne University
Women radio producers